Benjamin Bonzi was the defending champion but chose not to defend his title.

Ugo Humbert won the title after defeating Dominic Thiem 6–3, 6–0 in the final.

Seeds

Draw

Finals

Top half

Bottom half

References

External links
Main draw
Qualifying draw

Open de Rennes - 1
2022 Singles